Globicatella is a non-spore-forming and non-motile genus of bacteria from the family of Aerococcaceae.

References

Lactobacillales
Bacteria genera